Noctilien is the night bus service in Paris and its agglomeration. It is managed by the Île-de-France Mobilités (formerly the STIF), the Île-de-France regional public transit authority, and operated by RATP (with 32 lines) and Transilien SNCF (with 16 lines).

It replaced the previous Noctambus service on the night of 20/21 September 2005, providing for a larger number of lines than before and claiming to be better adapted to night-time transport needs.

In place of the previous hub-and-spoke scheme where all buses terminated at and departed from the heart of Paris: Châtelet , Noctilien's new service includes buses operating between banlieues (communes surrounding Paris proper) as well as outbound lines running from Paris' four main railway stations: Gare de l'Est, Gare de Lyon, Gare Montparnasse and Gare Saint-Lazare. In addition, these four stations are also connected to each other by a regular night bus service.

All in all, Noctilien operates 48 bus lines, from the end of the rail network and day bus service (around 00:30) until their resumption early in the morning (around 05:30), over the whole of Paris and the Île-de-France region.

It is made up of:
 2 circular lines:  &  running between Paris' major train stations ;
 21 radial lines (the other 2 digits lines, except N71) running between major Paris stations and more or less its near suburbs ;
 2 radial long distance lines:  &  (subcontracted by the RATP) running between Paris and its remote suburbs ;
 15 radial long distance lines (the other 3 digits lines, except N135) running between Paris and its remote suburbs (with often a partly motorway route) and managed by the Transilien SNCF ;
 2 ring lines in the suburbs:  by RATP &  by Transilien SNCF.

Like Transilien, the name "Noctilien" is formed by analogy with "Francilien" — the French demonym for residents of Île-de-France.

Noctilien lines

  - Inner (clockwise) circle line from and to Gare de l'Est    via Gare de Lyon    → Gare Montparnasse   → Gare Saint-Lazare   
  - Outer (counterclockwise) circle line from and to Gare Montparnasse    via Gare de Lyon    → Gare de l'Est    → Gare Saint-Lazare   
  - Pont de Neuilly  ↔ Château de Vincennes 
  - Pont de Sèvres  ↔ Romainville - Carnot
  - Mairie d'Issy  ↔ Bobigny - Pablo Picasso 
  - Mairie de Saint-Ouen  ↔ La Croix de Berny 
  - Asnières − Gennevilliers - Gabriel Péri  ↔ Villejuif - Louis Aragon 
  - Pont de Levallois  ↔ Mairie de Montreuil 
  - Châtelet   ↔ Longjumeau - Hôpital
  - Châtelet   ↔ Juvisy 
  - Châtelet   ↔ Chelles-Gournay  
  - Châtelet   ↔ Sartrouville  
  - Gare de Lyon    ↔ Paris Orly Airport (South Terminal)
  - Gare de Lyon    ↔ Boissy-Saint-Léger 
  - Gare de Lyon    ↔ Villiers-sur-Marne  (via Vincennes & Nogent-sur-Marne)
  - Gare de Lyon    ↔ Torcy 
  - Gare de Lyon    ↔ Villiers-sur-Marne  (via Maisons-Alfort & Saint-Maur-des-Fossés)
  - Gare de l'Est   ↔ Villeparisis – Mitry-le-Neuf 
  - Gare de l'Est   ↔ Aulnay-sous-Bois - Garonor
  - Gare de l'Est   ↔ Gare de Sarcelles-Saint-Brice 
  - Gare de l'Est   ↔ Garges-Sarcelles 
  - Gare de l'Est   ↔ Montfermeil - Hôpital
  - Gare Saint-Lazare     ↔ Gare d'Enghien 
  - Gare Saint-Lazare     ↔ Gare de Cormeilles-en-Parisis 
  - Gare Saint-Lazare     ↔ Nanterre - Anatole France
  - Gare Montparnasse   ↔ Clamart - Georges Pompidou 
  - Gare Montparnasse   ↔ Rungis International Market
  - Gare Montparnasse   ↔ École Polytechnique - Vauve 
  - Gare Montparnasse   ↔ Gare de Chaville-Rive-Droite 
  - Rungis International Market ↔ Val de Fontenay 
  - Châtelet   ↔ Saint-Rémy-lès-Chevreuse 
  - Gare de Lyon    ↔ Marne-la-Vallée - Chessy  (Disneyland Paris)
  - Gare de Lyon    ↔ Brétigny 
  - Gare de Lyon    ↔ Melun  
  - Gare de Lyon    ↔ Juvisy 
  - Gare de Lyon    ↔ Combs-la-Ville - Quincy 
  - Villeneuve-Saint-Georges  ↔ Corbeil-Essonnes 
  - Gare de l'Est   ↔ Paris Charles de Gaulle (CDG) Airport  (All Terminals)
  - Gare de l'Est   ↔ Gare de Meaux 
  - Gare de l'Est   ↔ Tournan  
  - Gare de l'Est   ↔ Paris Charles de Gaulle (CDG) Airport  (Semi-direct link to all Terminals)
  - Gare de Lyon    ↔ Corbeil-Essonnes 
  - Gare Montparnasse   ↔ Gare de La Verrière  (Gare de Rambouillet  On week-end nights)
  - Gare Saint-Lazare    ↔ Cergy Le Haut  
  - Gare Saint-Lazare    ↔ Gare de Mantes-la-Jolie 
  - Gare Saint-Lazare    ↔ Cergy Le Haut  
  - Gare Saint-Lazare    ↔ Saint Germain-en-Laye 
  - Gare Saint-Lazare    ↔ Montigny – Beauchamp

Line numbering scheme

2 digits starting with "N0" for the two "circular" routes
2 digits starting with "N1" for the "transversal" routes
2 digits starting with "N2" for buses running from Châtelet  
2 digits starting with "N3" for buses running from Gare de Lyon   
2 digits starting with "N4" for buses running from Gare de l'Est  
2 digits starting with "N5" for buses running from Gare Saint-Lazare   
2 digits starting with "N6" for buses running from Gare Montparnasse    
3 digits starting with "N1" for the long distance buses running to the outer suburbs.

References

This article draws heavily on the French Wikipedia page "Noctilien", downloaded 18 February 2006.

External links
Official website

Transport in Île-de-France
RATP Group
Transport in Paris
Transport in Hauts-de-Seine
Night bus service
Bus transport in France